The Marriage of William Ashe is a lost 1921 American silent film directed by Edward Sloman and starring May Allison. It was produced and distributed by Metro Pictures. It is based on the 1905 British novel The Marriage of William Ashe by Mary Augusta Ward and its subsequent play adaptation by Margaret Mayo.

The story was filmed before in 1916 in Britain by Cecil Hepworth.

Cast
May Allison as Lady Kitty Bristol
Wyndham Standing as William Ashe
Zeffie Tilbury as Lady Tranmore
Frank Elliott as Geoffrey Cliffe
Robert Bolder as Lord Parham
Lydia Yeamans Titus as Lady Parham
Clarissa Selwynne as Lady Mary Lyster

References

External links
 The Marriage of William Ashe at IMDb.com

1921 films
American silent feature films
American black-and-white films
Films directed by Edward Sloman
Metro Pictures films
Lost American films
Films based on British novels
Films set in England
1920s American films